Daniel Edgar (3 April 1910 – 23 March 1991) was an English professional footballer who played as a full-back for Sunderland.

References

1910 births
1991 deaths
Sportspeople from Jarrow
Footballers from Tyne and Wear
English footballers
Association football fullbacks
Sunderland A.F.C. players
Walsall F.C. players
Nottingham Forest F.C. players
English Football League players